Dieter Stinka (born 10 August 1937) is a former German football player. The midfielder won with Eintracht Frankfurt the German championship in 1959 and reached with the club the legendary 1960 European Cup Final against Real Madrid.

Career 
In 1958 he moved to Eintracht Frankfurt, coming from 1. FC Gelnhausen. In his second season at the Eagles, he won the German championship and achieved a runner-up medal in the following season at the European Cup. He played the first three Bundesliga seasons in Frankfurt.

On 3 October 1959, he was called up to the match of the German B national team in Konstanz against Switzerland. Together with Willi Schulz and Ferdinand Wenauer he formed the midfield. Bundestrainer Sepp Herberger called up Eintracht's left midfielder three times for the A national team: Against Belgium in Frankfurt on 8 March 1961, against Northern Ireland in Berlin on 10 May 1961 and against Denmark in Düsseldorf on 20 September 1961 but never received a cap. On his position Horst Szymaniak was seeded since the 1958 FIFA World Cup in Sweden.

The post officer Stinka was a tireless permanent issue in the Eagles' midfield. In 1961 and 1962 he won with Frankfurt the Oberliga Süd runner-up title and appeared in 16 German final round matches. After appearing in the 1965–66 season only four times, Stinka moved to lower class club SV Darmstadt 98, staying there until 1968. At FCA Darmstadt he announced his retirement.

Later Stinka became assistant and reserve squad coach at Eintracht. In the 1983–84 season, he managed FSV Frankfurt.

References

External links
 Dieter Stinka at eintracht-archiv.de 
 

1937 births
Living people
German footballers
Germany B international footballers
Bundesliga players
Eintracht Frankfurt players
SV Darmstadt 98 players
Association football midfielders
People from Olsztyn
Sportspeople from Warmian-Masurian Voivodeship
People from East Prussia
West German footballers
Eintracht Frankfurt non-playing staff